Donald Jay Fagen (born January 10, 1948) is an American musician best known as the co-founder, lead singer, co-songwriter, and keyboardist of the band Steely Dan, formed in the early 1970s with musical partner Walter Becker. In addition to his work with Steely Dan, Fagen has released four solo albums. He began his solo career in 1982 with the album The Nightfly, which was nominated for seven Grammy Awards. In 2001, Fagen was inducted into the Rock and Roll Hall of Fame as a member of Steely Dan. Following Becker's death in 2017, Fagen has continued to tour as the only original member of Steely Dan.

Early life
Fagen was born in Passaic, New Jersey, on January 10, 1948, to Jewish parents, Joseph "Jerry" Fagen, an accountant, and his wife, Elinor, a homemaker who had been a swing singer in upstate New York's Catskill Mountains from childhood through her teens. His family moved to Fair Lawn, a small town near Passaic. When he was ten years old, he moved with his parents and younger sister to Kendall Park, a newly constructed suburban section of South Brunswick, New Jersey. The transition upset him. He detested living in the suburbs. He later recalled that it "was like a prison. I think I lost faith in [my parents'] judgment... It was probably the first time I realized I had my own view of life." His life in Kendall Park, including his teenage love of late-night radio, inspired his later album The Nightfly.

Fagen became interested in rock and rhythm and blues (R&B) in the late 1950s. The first record he bought was "Reelin' and Rockin' " by Chuck Berry. At age eleven, a cousin recommended jazz music and Fagen went to the Newport Jazz Festival, becoming what he called a "jazz snob": "I lost interest in rock 'n' roll and started developing an anti-social personality." In the early 1960s, beginning at age twelve, he often went to the Village Vanguard, where he was particularly impressed by Earl Hines, Willie "The Lion" Smith, and Bill Evans. He regularly took the bus to Manhattan to see performances by jazz musicians Charles Mingus, Sonny Rollins, Thelonious Monk, and Miles Davis. He learned to play the piano, and he played baritone horn in the high school marching band. He developed a lifelong fondness for table tennis. In his late teens he was drawn to soul music, funk, Motown, and Sly and the Family Stone. He has also expressed admiration for the Boswell Sisters, Henry Mancini, and Ray Charles.

After graduating from South Brunswick High School in 1965, inspired by Allen Ginsberg, Jack Kerouac, and Lawrence Ferlinghetti, he enrolled at Bard College to study English literature, where he met  Walter Becker in a coffee house in 1967. Becker and Fagen attracted a revolving assortment of musicians including future actor Chevy Chase, to form the bands Leather Canary, the Don Fagen Jazz Trio, and the Bad Rock Band. Fagen described his college bands as sounding like "the Kingsmen performing Frank Zappa material". None of the groups lasted long, but the partnership between Fagen and Becker did. The duo's early career included working with Jay and the Americans, for which they used pseudonyms. In the early 1970s they worked as pop songwriters for ABC/Dunhill Records, which released all of Steely Dan's 1970s albums.

Career

Steely Dan

Becker and Fagen began to form Steely Dan in the summer of 1970, responding to a Village Voice ad for "a bassist and keyboard player with jazz chops" placed by guitarist Denny Dias.  Dias was immediately impressed by the pair's abilities, and especially that they already had a whole stack of original material. (Fans of Beat Generation literature, Fagen and Becker named the band after a steam-powered vibrator mentioned in the William S. Burroughs novel Naked Lunch.) The group's first lineup was assembled in December 1971 in Los Angeles, where Becker and Fagen had relocated to work as staff songwriters for ABC/Dunhill. Becker and Fagen formed the core of the band and wrote all the songs, with Becker on bass, and later lead guitar, and Fagen on keyboards and vocals.

After the release of their third LP in 1974, the other members left or were fired from the band, which evolved into a studio project headed by Becker and Fagen. Steely Dan's best-selling album was 1977's Aja, which was certified platinum. Three years later, they released Gaucho. Their next album wasn't until 1995, when they released the live album Alive in America. It was followed by the multiple Grammy Award winning Two Against Nature in 2000, and Steely Dan's most recent album Everything Must Go in 2003. A concert DVD, Two Against Nature, included material from much of the band's history.

After Becker's death in 2017, Fagen wished to retire the Steely Dan name out of respect for his bandmate and tour under a different name, but promoters advised him against it for commercial reasons. As of 2022, Fagen continues to tour as Steely Dan.<ref
></ref>

Solo career
After Steely Dan's breakup in 1981, Fagen released his debut solo album, The Nightfly, in October 1982. It was certified platinum for sales of over a million copies in the U.S. and reached 11 on the Billboard Top 200 albums list. The first single, "I.G.Y.", released in September 1982, peaked at number 26 on the Hot 100. The follow-up single, "New Frontier" (January 1983), peaked at number 70 and was accompanied by a music video. The Nightfly was nominated for the Grammy Award for Album of the Year. In 2002, Rhino Records released a DVD-Audio version of The Nightfly in honor of the album's 20th anniversary. The bonus track, "True Companion", from The Nightfly Trilogy MVI Boxed Set is track seven on the Heavy Metal film soundtrack. Fagen also contributed "Century's End" to the soundtrack for the 1988 Michael J. Fox film, Bright Lights, Big City.

During the rest of the 1980s, Fagen contributed to soundtracks and wrote a column for Premiere magazine. In the early 1990s, he toured with the New York Rock and Soul Revue. Becker and Fagen reunited in 1986 to work on the debut album by model and singer Rosie Vela. Fagen co-produced and played keyboards on Walter Becker's solo album debut 11 Tracks of Whack (1994). Becker produced Fagen's second album, Kamakiriad (1993), which was nominated for the Grammy Award for Album of the Year and reached number 10 on the Top 200 albums chart.

Fagen's third solo album, Morph the Cat, was released on March 14, 2006, and featured Wayne Krantz (guitar), Jon Herington (guitar), Keith Carlock (drums), Freddie Washington (bass), Ted Baker (piano), and Walt Weiskopf (sax). It reached 26 on Billboard Top 200 albums list. Morph the Cat was named Album of the Year by Mix magazine. The 5.1 surround sound mix won the Grammy Award for Best Surround Sound Album.

Fagen's first three albums were released in a box set, The Nightfly Trilogy, in the MVI (Music Video Interactive) format. Each album features DTS 5.1, Dolby 5.1 and PCM Stereo mix but no MLP encoded track, along with bonus audio and video content.

Fagen's fourth album, Sunken Condos, was released in 2012. It reached 12 on the Billboard Top 200 albums list.

In 2012, Fagen toured with the Dukes of September, featuring Michael McDonald and Boz Scaggs. One of the concerts was recorded at Lincoln Center in New York City and broadcast on PBS Great Performances in 2014.

In 2013, Fagen published an autobiography titled Eminent Hipsters. A biography Nightfly: The Life of Steely Dan's Donald Fagen by Peter Jones was published in 2022.

Fagen frequently uses aliases. He wrote the liner notes to Can't Buy a Thrill under the name Tristan Fabriani, which he used on stage when he played keyboards for Jay and the Americans (Becker used Gus Mahler). On his solo albums, when he played or programmed a synthesizer part to replicate a real instrument (bass, vibraphone, horns) he credited one of his aliases: Illinois Elohainu, Phonus Quaver, or Harlan Post.

Style and themes 
Fagen has classified himself as both a self-taught pianist and a self-taught vocalist, although he did spend a few semesters studying formally at Berklee College of Music and took some vocal lessons in the mid-1970s as a precaution after feeling the straining effects of years of touring. Although he learned to become an entertainer, early on Fagen suffered from severe stage fright, which prompted Steely Dan producer Gary Katz to hire David Palmer to sing two songs on Steely Dan's debut album, Can't Buy a Thrill. This also led to the hiring of Royce Jones and Michael McDonald as singers in the band's tours in the early 1970s. Fagen plays the Fender Rhodes electric piano and Wurlitzer electric piano.

According to Robert Christgau, in terms of lyrics, Fagen is a "pathological ironist" who "doesn't much care about hippies" or the message of his generation's counterculture: "His '60s are the Kennedy years, when a smart, somewhat shallow suburban white kid could dream of Brubeck and bohemia and bomb-shelter wingdings and transoceanic rail links to exotic locales."

Personal life
Fagen's cousin Alan Rosenberg is an actor who was president of the Screen Actors Guild, while his cousin Mark Rosenberg was an activist in Students for a Democratic Society and a film producer.

In 1993 Fagen married songwriter Libby Titus. Although the two attended Bard College at around the same time, they did not become friends until 1987 when they were backstage at a Dr. John concert. On January 4, 2016, Titus sustained injuries after Fagen allegedly shoved her against a marble window frame at their Upper East Side apartment. Titus informed the New York Post that she was divorcing her husband. The two have since reconciled.

Titus co-wrote the song "Florida Room" on the 1993 album Kamakiriad. Fagen has performed with his stepdaughter Amy Helm, daughter of Titus and musician Levon Helm. Fagen has no children of his own.

Awards
1985: Honorary Doctor of Arts, Bard College
2001: Honorary Doctor of Music, Berklee College of Music
2001: Steely Dan inducted into the Rock and Roll Hall of Fame
2010: Jazz Wall of Fame, American Society of Composers, Authors and Publishers

Discography

Studio albums

Collaborations
 1971: Barbra Streisand, Barbra Joan Streisand – Hammond organ
 1973: Tim Moore, Tim Moore – vocals ("A Fool Like You")
 1975: Poco, Head over Heels – synthesizer
 1977: Poco, Indian Summer – synthesizer
1978: Marc Jordan, Mannequin - keyboards
 1978: Pete Christlieb and Warne Marsh, Apogee – producer
 1981: Rickie Lee Jones, Pirates – synthesizer
 1982: Eye to Eye, Eye to Eye – producer, synthesizer
 1983; Diana Ross, Ross, Love Will Make It Right – writer, synthesizer
 1984: Various artists, That's the Way I Feel Now: A Tribute to Thelonious Monk – "Reflections" with Steve Khan
 1986: Rosie Vela, Zazu – synthesizer
 1988: Various artists, The Gospel at Colonus soundtrack – producer
 1990: William S. Burroughs, Dead City Radio – musical accompaniment on "A New Standard by Which to Measure Infamy"
 1991: The New York Rock and Soul Revue, The New York Rock and Soul Revue: Live at the Beacon – producer, vocals, piano, Fender Rhodes piano, melodica
 1992: Jennifer Warnes, The Hunter (Jennifer Warnes album), Big Noise, New York - writer, backing vocals
 1994: Walter Becker, 11 Tracks of Whack – producer, arranger, keyboards
 1997: Boz Scaggs, My Time: A Boz Scaggs Anthology, "Drowning in the Sea of Love" – producer, vocals, piano, electric piano [Fender Rhodes], melodica
 2001: Phoebe Snow, The Very Best of Phoebe Snow – producer
 2008: Martha Wainwright, I Know You're Married But I've Got Feelings Too – synthesizer
 2014: Michael McDonald & Boz Scaggs, "The Dukes of September Live (New York 2012)" - keyboards, vocals
 2017: Todd Rundgren, "Tin Foil Hat" from the album White Knight – vocals

References

External links
 Donald Fagen interview at Wax Poetics

1948 births
Living people
American rock singers
American rock musicians
American rock pianists
American male pianists
American organists
20th-century American keyboardists
Songwriters from New Jersey
Bard College alumni
Jazz-rock pianists
Jewish American musicians
Grammy Award winners
Jewish American songwriters
People from Fair Lawn, New Jersey
Musicians from Passaic, New Jersey
People from South Brunswick, New Jersey
Melodica players
Pupils of Jacob Druckman
Jewish rock musicians
South Brunswick High School (New Jersey) alumni
American baritones
20th-century American pianists
20th-century organists
21st-century American keyboardists
21st-century American pianists
21st-century organists
20th-century American male singers
20th-century American singers
21st-century American male singers
21st-century American singers
21st-century American Jews
American male songwriters
The Dukes of September members
The New York Rock and Soul Revue members